Silent Running is a 1972 American environmental-themed science fiction film. It is the directorial debut of Douglas Trumbull, and stars Bruce Dern, Cliff Potts, Ron Rifkin, and Jesse Vint.

Plot
In the future, all plant life on Earth has become extinct due to an unexplained cause. As many specimens as possible have been preserved in a series of enormous greenhouse-like geodesic domes attached to large cargo spaceships, forming part of a fleet of eight "American Airlines Space Freighters", stationed outside the orbit of Saturn.

Freeman Lowell, one of four crewmen, is the resident botanist and ecologist on one of these ships, the Valley Forge. He carefully maintains a variety of plants for their eventual return to Earth and the reforestation of the planet. He spends most of his time in the domes, cultivating the crops and attending to the animal life.

The crew of each ship receives orders to jettison and destroy their domes and return the freighters to commercial service. After four of the six Valley Forge domes are jettisoned and destroyed with nuclear charges, Lowell rebels and opts to save his ship's plants and animals. He kills Wolf, one of his crewmates who arrives to plant explosives in his favorite dome, and his right leg is seriously injured in the process. He then jettisons and triggers the destruction of the other remaining dome to trap and kill the remaining two crewmen.

Enlisting the aid of the ship's three service robots, Lowell stages a fake premature explosion as a ruse and sends the Valley Forge careening toward Saturn in an attempt to hijack the ship and flee with the last forest dome. He then reprograms the drones to perform surgery on his leg and sets the Valley Forge on a risky course through Saturn's rings. Later, as the ship endures the rough passage, Drone 3 is lost, but the ship and its remaining dome emerge relatively undamaged on the other side of the rings. Lowell gives the surviving drones the names Dewey (Drone 1) and Huey (Drone 2), while the lost Drone 3 is named Louie (a nod to Disney characters Huey, Dewey, and Louie).

Lowell, Huey, and Dewey set out into deep space to maintain the forest. Lowell reprograms Huey and Dewey to plant trees and play poker. He also has them bury John in the bio-dome. Lowell begins speaking to them constantly, as if they are children.

Huey is damaged when Lowell accidentally collides with him while driving a buggy recklessly, and Dewey sentimentally refuses to leave Huey's side during the repairs. As time passes, Lowell is horrified when he discovers that his bio-dome is dying, but is unable to come up with a solution to the problem. When the Berkshire — another space freighter waiting to see if the Valley Forge has survived the trip around Saturn — eventually reestablishes contact, he knows that his crimes will soon be discovered. It is then that he realizes a lack of light has restricted plant growth, and he races to install lamps to correct this situation. In an effort to save the last forest before the Berkshire arrives, Lowell jettisons the bio-dome to safety. He then detonates nuclear charges, destroying the Valley Forge, the damaged Huey, and himself in the process. The final scene is of the now well-lit forest greenhouse drifting into deep space, with Dewey tenderly caring for it, holding Lowell's battered old watering can.

Cast

 Bruce Dern as Freeman Lowell
 Cliff Potts as John Keenan
 Ron Rifkin as Marty Barker
 Jesse Vint as Andy Wolf
 Mark Persons as Drone 1 (Dewey)
 Cheryl Sparks and Steven Brown as Drone 2 (Huey)
 Larry Whisenhunt as Drone 3 (Louie)

Production
Trumbull was involved with creating effects for 2001: A Space Odyssey (1968), whose director, Stanley Kubrick, had wanted that film's Stargate sequence to be about Saturn; however, technical difficulties prevented completion of the sequence's special effects within the limited time available. The Saturn idea was scrapped, and Kubrick substituted Jupiter instead. Trumbull developed the sequence after production, and it was recreated for Saturn in Silent Running.

The interiors were filmed aboard the decommissioned Korean War aircraft carrier USS Valley Forge (LPH-8), which was docked at the Long Beach Naval Shipyard in Long Beach, California. Shortly after filming was completed, the carrier was scrapped. The forest environments were originally intended to be filmed in the Mitchell Park Domes in Milwaukee, but the production budget forced the sequences to be shot in a newly completed aircraft hangar in Van Nuys, California. Trumbull stated in the commentary accompanying the DVD release that the geodesic domes containing the last forests of Earth's future on the Valley Forge were based on the Missouri Botanical Garden's Climatron dome.

Three freighters are shown in the film: the Valley Forge, the Berkshire and the Sequoia. Five other ships that carried domes – the Yellowstone, Acadia, Blue Ridge, Glacier, and Mojave — are also mentioned. Each ship features a designation on the hull that notes the area from which some of its flora and fauna samples were taken. The Valley Forge is listed as "Bahia Honda Subtropical," indicating at least some specimens were taken from this area of the Florida Keys.

After filming was completed, American Airlines expressed an interest in sending the model on the tour circuit, but this was not feasible due to its fragile nature. (During filming, pieces of the model frequently detached.) It was subsequently dismantled after sitting for several years in Trumbull's personal storage facility. Several pieces, including the domes, wound up in the hands of collectors. Several domes survive, including one that now rests in the Science Fiction Museum and Hall of Fame in Seattle, and another that was sold at auction in 2008.

The three drones were played by four bilateral amputees, an idea inspired by Johnny Eck, a sideshow performer of the early 20th century who was born without lower limbs. The  drone suits were custom-tailored for the actors. The suits are in Trumbull's personal collection.

The sound effects, including the drones, were created by uncredited composer Joseph Byrd. They were generated on a modified ARP 2600 synthesizer with added Oberheim Expander Modules.

Soundtrack
The soundtrack was written by Peter Schickele, a bassoonist who also composes comedy music under the name P. D. Q. Bach. It contains two songs written by Schickele and Diane Lampert, which were performed by vocalist Joan Baez: "Silent Running" and "Rejoice in the Sun". The two songs were issued as a single by Decca (32890). An LP was released by Decca in 1972 (DL 7-9188) and later reissued by Varese Sarabande on black (STV-81072) and green (VC-81072) vinyl. In 1998, a limited-release CD by the Valley Forge Record Groupe included an additional track with the spoken introduction "God Bless These Gardens." A CD with audio restoration was released in 2016 by Intrada, Special Collection Volume 369.

The band 65daysofstatic recorded an alternative soundtrack to the film, released in 2011 and commissioned by the Glasgow Film Festival.

Reception
 
On Rotten Tomatoes the film has an approval rating of 71% based on reviews from 34 critics. The critical consensus states: "It doesn't fulfill the potential of its ambitious themes, but Silent Running stands as a decidedly unique type of sci-fi journey marked by intimate character work and a melancholic mood." On Metacritic the film has a score of 67% based on reviews from 13 critics, indicating "generally favorable reviews".

Vincent Canby, reviewing the film for The New York Times, said that Silent Running "is no jerry-built science fiction film, but it's a little too simple-minded to be consistently entertaining." Carl Sagan criticized the "technically proficient" film for depicting a future in which people have forgotten the inverse-square law, and that plants need sunlight. Roger Ebert awarded the film his highest rating of four stars and praised Dern as "a very good, subtle actor." Gene Siskel gave the film two stars out of four and compared it unfavorably to 2001: A Space Odyssey, saying that it had "the same effects but none of the wit or intelligence." Arthur D. Murphy of Variety lauded the "excellent special effects" and "broadly entertaining script" but faulted the "crucial miscasting" of Dern, explaining, "Walking around often in robes which crudely suggest some kind of airborne vegetarian Noah, and otherwise suggesting an out-to-lunch mentality, his characterization does not evoke empathy." Charles Champlin of the Los Angeles Times praised the film for avoiding "the usual heavy hokum associated with the [sci-fi] genre" and called it "a solid and well-disciplined first film. The spaceries really are impressive and the movie is an ingenious family entertainment which offers something to think about." Gary Arnold of The Washington Post called the film "the most original and interesting science-fiction melodrama since 'Planet of the Apes' and a new classic of the genre." Penelope Gilliatt of The New Yorker wrote: "The robots have endearing qualities, paddling about as if in galoshes, and they play a wonderful game of poker, but this is sci-fi with the soul of an editorial." British film critic Mark Kermode has said that the film is a personal favorite and that he prefers it to 2001.

Adaptation
A novelization of the film was published by Scholastic Books in 1972. It was written by longtime children's book author Harlan Thompson, based on the screen story and screenplay by Cimino, Washburn, and Bochco. It features expanded scenes (in flashback) taking place on Earth.

Home media
The film has been released several times on home video by Universal Studios Home Entertainment, beginning with the Betamax "pan and scan" release in 1982, and several VHS releases that followed. A DVD was released featuring the film's original 1.85:1 aspect ratio on May 21, 2002. A Blu-ray of the film was released on 14 November 2011 by Eureka: a 40th-anniversary release in its Masters of Cinema series, Region B-locked, 1080p, with extensive extras, initially in a steelbook case. Another was released by Arrow on 17 November 2020, which is 2K on disc, from a 4K scan of the film, with the same extras plus more. Both were released under license from Universal Studios, with transfers approved by director Douglas Trumbull. This same approved 4K transfer was used to create a 4K UHD version of the film, again released by Arrow Video in December 2022.

See also
 List of American films of 1972
 Environmentalism

References

External links

 
 
 
 Silent Running at the Internet Speculative Fiction Database
 Sci-Fi Movie website analysis
 In-depth review of Silent Running at the Space Review

American dystopian films
American post-apocalyptic films
American robot films
American science fiction films
American space adventure films
Environmental films
Robot films
Films set on spacecraft
Rings of Saturn in fiction
Saturn in film
Universal Pictures films
1970s dystopian films
1970s science fiction films
1972 directorial debut films
1972 films
1970s English-language films
Films directed by Douglas Trumbull
American Airlines
1970s American films